Ian Ferguson (born 15 March 1967) is a Scottish football coach and retired professional player.

He started his career with Clyde, then moved to St Mirren in 1986, scoring the winning goal as the club won the 1987 Scottish Cup Final. Ferguson moved to Rangers in 1988 and stayed with the Ibrox club for 12 years, during which time he helped them win nine consecutive Scottish league championships. He has since been inducted to the club's Hall of Fame. He played for Dunfermline Athletic for two seasons, before emigrating to Australia where he played for Northern Spirit and Central Coast Mariners. Ferguson appeared in nine full international matches for Scotland.

Since retiring as a player, he has managed North Queensland Fury, Perth Glory, Northern Fury and Stirling Macedonia.

Club career

St Mirren
Raised in the Parkhead area of Glasgow within a few blocks of Celtic Park, although he grew up as a supporter of Rangers, Ferguson started his career with Clyde (he had an unsuccessful trial with Aberdeen in 1983), but was transferred to St Mirren for £60,000 in 1986. Aged 20, he scored the winning goal in the 1987 Scottish Cup Final, as St Mirren won 1–0 against Dundee United.

Rangers
Nine months after winning the Scottish Cup, he transferred to Rangers for £850,000 – still the record fee received by St Mirren – turning down offers from English clubs to become part of the strong squad being assembled at Ibrox by Graeme Souness. He is remembered as a key player of the era at the club, appearing 336 times and scoring 42 goals. Along with Ally McCoist and Richard Gough, he played a part in every season of Rangers' historic run of nine titles in a row between 1988–89 and 1996–97 under managers Souness and Walter Smith. Having picked up his first winner's medal a decade earlier, scoring in the 1988 Scottish League Cup Final, he also featured in the first title win with manager Dick Advocaat in 1998–99, and appeared as a substitute in the League Cup and Scottish Cup finals that season. His playing time became limited under Advocaat, and he moved on to Dunfermline Athletic in 2000.

He was given a testimonial match by Rangers, played against Sunderland on 21 July 1999.

Dunfermline Athletic
Ferguson spent two seasons in Fife, during which he helped newly promoted Dunfermline to keep their place in the top division (9th in 2000–01) and then improve it (6th in 2001–02). He then moved to Australia to see out the final years as a player and begin his managerial career.

International career
Ferguson won nine international caps for Scotland, achieved at irregular intervals over a period of nine years. His last appearance was in a goalless draw against Estonia in February 1997. After the game, Ferguson was overheard by a microphone apparently swearing at the Scotland supporters. Ferguson apologised to the Scotland manager, Craig Brown, and he was included in the next squad.

Managerial career

North Queensland Fury FC
On 15 September 2008, Ferguson was confirmed as the new manager of North Queensland FC leaving his post as assistant manager at Central Coast Mariners. He took up the post straight away in order to give the team the best preparation possible for their inaugural season in Australia's Hyundai A League. Ferguson lasted only one year with the Fury, when the club folded due to financial instability.

Perth Glory FC
In 2010 Ferguson moved to become the assistant to David Mitchell at the Perth Glory at the end of the 2009–10 season and becoming the coach on 12 October 2010 after David Mitchell resigned. On 27 March 2012 he signed a two-year contract extension with the club.

Ferguson successfully guided Perth Glory to their first A-League Grand Final in April 2012, after beating Minor A-League Premiers Central Coast Mariners in a penalty shootout at the Mariners' home ground in Gosford. However they lost the subsequent Grand Final 2–1 following a late comeback from Brisbane Roar who were awarded a controversial injury-time penalty.

Ferguson's contract was mutually terminated on 11 February 2013 as Perth Glory manager, after five straight losses and six hours of game time without a goal scored.

Northern Fury FC (NPL Queensland)
In 2013, Ferguson was announced as the Director of Football and Coaching at the Townsville NPL Queensland franchise Northern Fury FC.

On 16 February 2017, Ferguson resigned as Northern Fury manager, less than a fortnight from the beginning of the Fury's season. He was replaced by Paul Roncato.

Stirling Macedonia FC (WA State League)
On 3 November 2020, Stirling Macedonia FC announced Ian Ferguson as the new First team coach.

Career statistics

International appearances

Managerial record

Honours

Player
St Mirren
Scottish Cup: 1986–87

Rangers
Scottish League (10): 1988–89, 1989–90, 1990–91, 1991–92, 1992–93, 1993–94, 1994–95, 1995–96, 1996–97, 1998–99
Scottish Cup: 1992–93, 1995–96, 1998–99; runner-up 1988–89, 1993–94, 1997–98
Scottish League Cup: 1988–89, 1990–91, 1992–93, 1993–94, 1998–99

Manager
Perth Glory
 A-League: runner-up 2011–12

References

External links
 Central Coast Mariners profile 
 Rangers Hall of Fame profile 

1967 births
Living people
Scottish footballers
Scottish football managers
Scotland international footballers
Scotland B international footballers
Scottish expatriate footballers
Scottish expatriate football managers
Scottish expatriate sportspeople in Australia
Expatriate soccer players in Australia
Scottish Football League players
Scottish Premier League players
Footballers from Glasgow
A-League Men players
National Soccer League (Australia) players
Central Coast Mariners FC players
Clyde F.C. players
Dunfermline Athletic F.C. players
Northern Spirit FC players
Rangers F.C. players
St Mirren F.C. players
Expatriate soccer managers in Australia
A-League Men managers
Scotland under-21 international footballers
Perth Glory FC managers
Association football midfielders